Alda Bandeira Tavares Vaz da Conceição (born September 22, 1949) is a politician in São Tomé and Príncipe.

Bandeira was born in Santana, São Tomé in 1949. Her father was a nurse. She studied modern languages at Eduardo Mondlane University in Maputo, Mozambique, received an MA in modern languages and literature from Lisbon University, and studied international relations at the Lisbon Instituto Superior de Ciências Sociais e Políticas. Bandeira taught in secondary schools in Maputo and São Tomé between 1975 and 1982.

Bandeira began her political career as the director of multilateral cooperation in the Ministry of Foreign Affairs, a position she held from 1987 to 1990. She also served as national coordinator for US African Development Foundation programs in São Tomé from 1988–1990. Bandeira was one of the founding members of the Democratic Convergence Party-Reflection Group (PCD-GR), the first public opposition group in the country. After an overwhelming victory for the party in the 1991 elections, Bandeira held the office of foreign minister from 1991 until 1993. After her husband Norberto Costa Alegre was appointed prime minister, she stepped down from her position in the government to occupy her seat as a Member of Parliament and avoid conflicts of interest.

Bandeira was elected president of the PCD-GR in 1995, an office she held until 2001. In 1996 she ran for President of the country, coming in third place with 15% of the vote. Bandeira taught at the Instituto Superior Politécnico in São Tomé from 2000–2002. In April 2002 she was appointed foreign minister again, but resigned later that year. Bandeira is currently serving as the Director General of the newly formed Instituto Marítimo e de Administracão Portuaria (Maritime and Port Administration Institute) in São Tomé.

References

1949 births
Living people
People from Cantagalo District
Foreign Ministers of São Tomé and Príncipe
Women government ministers of São Tomé and Príncipe
Democratic Convergence Party (São Tomé and Príncipe) politicians
Female foreign ministers
20th-century women politicians
21st-century women politicians
São Tomé and Príncipe women diplomats
20th-century São Tomé and Príncipe politicians
21st-century São Tomé and Príncipe politicians